The 2021–22 Hofstra Pride men's basketball team represented Hofstra University during the 2021–22 NCAA Division I men's basketball season. The Pride was coached by Speedy Claxton, who was in his second season. They played their home games at Mack Sports Complex in Hempstead, New York as members of the Colonial Athletic Association.

Previous season
The Pride finished the 2020–21 season 13–10, 8–6 in CAA play to come in fourth place. They lost to Elon in the semifinals of the CAA tournament.

Roster

Schedule and results

|-
!colspan=9 style=| Non-conference regular season

|-
!colspan=12 style=| CAA regular season

|-
!colspan=9 style=| CAA tournament

|-

Source

References

Hofstra Pride men's basketball seasons
Hofstra
Hofstra Pride men's basketball
Hofstra Pride men's basketball